The Hårsfjärden, or Horsfjärden, is a fjard off the Baltic Sea near Stockholm, Sweden.
It is the location of three Swedish naval bases: Märsgarn, Muskö, and Berga.

It was the location of the Hårsfjärden incident, during October 1–13, 1982, in which Swedish forces appeared to have trapped a foreign submarine, believed to be Soviet, but the submarine escaped.

Three Swedish destroyers were sunk in the Hårsfjärden in an explosion on 17 September 1941, during World War II. Göteborg and Klas Horn were later salvaged and returned to service, while Klas Ugla was scrapped.

References

Fjords of Sweden
Swedish Navy
Landforms of Stockholm County